Sallaumines (or Sallau) is a commune in the Pas-de-Calais department of northern France.

Administration
Sallaumines belongs to the Lens-Liévin intercommunality which consists of 36 communes, with a total population of 250,000 inhabitants.

History
The history of the area remains marked by the Courrières mine disaster which caused 1099 deaths on 10 March 1906 on the territories of Billy-Montigny, Méricourt and Sallaumines.

On 18 June 1916 Max Immelmann, the first German World War I flying ace, was killed by the British 25 Squadron Royal Flying Corps while flying over the area.

Population

Geography
Its nearby communes are Méricourt to the southeast, Avion to the southwest, Lens to the west, Loison-sous-Lens to the north, Harnes to the northeast and Montigny-en-Gohelle to the east.

Transportation
The A21 motorway passes north of the town. Sallaumines has a train station (Gare de Sallaumines) on the line from Lens to Lille, and another one (Gare de Pont-de-Sallaumines) on the line from Lens to Valenciennes.

Twin towns - sister cities
Sallaumines is twinned with:
 Lugau, Germany
 Torez, Ukraine
 Trbovlje, Slovenia
 Wodzisław Śląski, Poland

See also
Communes of the Pas-de-Calais department

References

External links

 Communauté d'Agglomération de Lens-Liévin (in French)

Communes of Pas-de-Calais
Artois